Amenamevir  (trade name Amenalief) is an antiviral drug used for the treatment of shingles (herpes zoster).

It acts as an inhibitor of the zoster virus's helicase–primase complex.Amenamevir was approved in Japan for the treatment of shingles in 2017.

References 

Antiviral drugs
Oxadiazoles
Sulfones